Jobbing may refer to:

 selling stocks and shares as a stockjobber
 jobbing press, a variety of printing press used in letterpress printing used for work other than books and journals (e. g. hand bills, trade cards, etc.)
 losing or lying down in professional wrestling, see Job (professional wrestling)

See also 
 Jobber (disambiguation)